cmus (C* Music Player) is a small and fast console audio player for Unix-like operating systems.
cmus is distributed under the terms of the GPL-2.0-or-later and operates exclusively through a text-based user interface, built with ncurses.

The text-only design reduces the resources needed to run the program, making it a strong choice for older or less-powerful computers as well as systems where a graphical environment (such as the X Window System) is not available.

History 
cmus was originally written by Timo Hirvonen. At around June 2008 he discontinued development of cmus, which resulted in a fork named "cmus-unofficial" in November 2008. After a year of development, a take over request was sent to SourceForge, which was granted after a 90-day period without response from the original author. This resulted in a merge of the fork back into the official project in February 2010.

User interface 
cmus' interface is centered on views. There are two views on the music library (an artist/album tree and a flat sortable list) and views on playlists, the current play queue, the file system and for filters/settings. There is always only one view visible at any time.

Owing to the console-orientation and portability goals of the project, cmus is controlled exclusively via the keyboard.
Commands are loosely modeled after those of the vi text editor. General operation mimics being in command-mode of vi, where complex commands are issued by prepending them with a colon, (e.g. ":add /home/user/music-dir"), simpler, more common commands are bound to individual keys, such as "j/k" moving down/up, or "x" starting playback, and searches beginning with "/" as in "/the beatles".

Core features 

 Support for many audio formats, including: Ogg Vorbis, MP3, FLAC, Musepack, WavPack, Wav, MPEG-4/AAC, ALAC, WMA, APE, TTA, SHN and MOD.
 Gapless playback
 ReplayGain support
 MP3 and Ogg streaming (SHOUTcast/Icecast)
 Powerful music library filters / live filtering
 Play queue
 Compilations handling
 Customizable colors and dynamic keybindings
 Vi style search and command mode
 Remote controllable through cmus-remote program (UNIX socket or TCP/IP)
 Known to work on many Unix-like systems, including Linux, macOS, FreeBSD, NetBSD, OpenBSD, Cygwin and OpenWrt

See also 

 MusikCube
 Comparison of free software for audio
 List of Linux audio software

References

External links 
 Official website
 cmus git repository
 cmus-devel mailing list archive
 

Free audio software
Free media players
Linux media players
Software that uses ncurses
Audio player software for Linux
Free software programmed in C
Console applications
Software that uses FFmpeg